Lisa Davis may refer to:

Lisa Davis (actress) (born 1936), English-born American actress
Lisa Davis (businesswoman) (born 1963), American businesswoman, chair and CEO, Siemens Corp
Lisa Corinne Davis (active since 2000), American artist
Lisa Davis, a character in 1980 American comedy Airplane!, played by Jill Whelan

See also
Elizabeth Davis (disambiguation)
Lisa Davies (disambiguation)